The Canton of Le Petit-Quevilly is a canton situated in the Seine-Maritime département and in the Normandy region of northern France.

Geography 
A town of light industry and manufacturing situated on the left bank of the Seine, immediately south of Rouen in the arrondissement of Rouen. The altitude varies from 3m to 33m with an average altitude of 5m.

Composition 
At the French canton reorganisation which came into effect in March 2015, the canton was expanded from 1 to 2 communes:
Petit-Quevilly
Sotteville-lès-Rouen (partly)

Population

See also 
 Arrondissements of the Seine-Maritime department
 Cantons of the Seine-Maritime department
 Communes of the Seine-Maritime department

References

Petit-Quevilly